Lokavec is a settlement on the northern edge of the Vipava Valley northwest of Ajdovščina in the Littoral region of Slovenia. It lies below the slopes of Mount Čaven, below the Slano Blato Landslide. It includes the hamlets of Bitovi, Brith (or Britih), Čohi, Gorenje, Kuši, Lahovše, Loretovše, Mizinška Vas, Paljki (or Palki), and Slokarji.

Name
Lokavec was first attested in written sources in 1086 as Locunz and Locarizz. The name is derived from the adjective *lǫkavъ 'twisted, winding' or from the common noun *lǫkava 'curve, twist', perhaps originally a hydronym.

History
The discovery of Celtic grave sites in Lovavec shows that it was already settled in prehistoric times. The Celtic settlement there had a defensive structure built on Gradišče Hill.

During the Second World War, German forces arrested all of the men in the settlement capable of bearing arms and sent them to perform forced labor.

Mass grave
Lokavec is the site of a mass grave from the period immediately after the Second World War. It contains the remains of five to seven Slovenian civilians murdered around 20 June 1945.

Postwar
Lokavec annexed the formerly independent settlement of Dolnji Lokavec in 1952.

Churches
There are three churches in the village: the parish church, belonging to the Koper Diocese and dedicated to Saint Lawrence, a second church dedicated to Saint Urban, and a church dedicated to St. Mary of the Assumption.

Notable people
Notable people that were born or lived in Lokavec include:
Miha Blažko (1810–1897), master mason
Edmund Čibej (1861–1954), journalist and mineralogist
Venceslav Čopič (1893–1980), education specialist
Michael Cussa (ca. 1657–1699), sculptor
Teodor Posteli (1909–1993), cardiologist
Anton Slokar (1898–1982), politician

References

External links 

Lokavec at Geopedia

Populated places in the Municipality of Ajdovščina